Kulaseh or Kulasah or Kul Aseh may refer to:
 Kulaseh, Javanrud, Kermanshah Province
 Kulasah, Kurdistan

See also
Kolasah (disambiguation)